Brit Bennett is an American writer based in Los Angeles. Her debut novel The Mothers (2016) was a New York Times best-seller. Her second novel, The Vanishing Half (2020), was also a New York Times best-seller and it was chosen as a Good Morning America Book Club selection. The Vanishing Half  was selected as one of The New York Times ten best books of 2020.

Early life 
Bennett was raised in Southern California and received an undergraduate degree in English from Stanford University. She later attended the University of Michigan for her M.F.A. She also studied at Oxford University.

Career 
While she was completing her M.F.A. at Michigan, Bennett's 2014 essay for Jezebel, "I Don't Know What to Do With Good White People" gained considerable attention, generating over one million views in three days. While at Michigan, she also won a Hopwood Award in Graduate Short Fiction as well as the 2014 Hurston/Wright Award for College Writers.

She has since published other nonfiction essays, including a history of black dolls called "Addy Walker, American Girl" for the Paris Review, as well as a review of the 2015 Ta-Nehisi Coates book Between the World and Me for The New Yorker. Vogue said Bennett's nonfiction essays "recall Ta-Nehisi Coates [with] a similar ability to contextualize the present moment in a bigoted past."

The Mothers 

In 2016, Riverhead Books published her debut novel The Mothers to critical acclaim. A New York Times best-seller, the Times said The Mothers is "shaping up to be one of the fall’s biggest literary debuts, with an initial printing of 108,000 copies and starred reviews in Booklist, Library Journal and Publishers Weekly." Bennett was named in the National Book Foundation "5 under 35" list of promising debut novelists. In March 2017, it was reported that The Mothers had been tapped by Warner Bros. for a film adaptation, with Kerry Washington as a producer.

The Vanishing Half 

In 2020, Bennett's second book The Vanishing Half was published by Riverhead Books, reaching the number-one spot on The New York Times best-seller list in June and was chosen as a New York Times best-seller and was chosen as a Good Morning America Book Club selection.  The Vanishing Half was also selected as one of The New York Times ten best books of 2020. The Washington Post called The Vanishing Half a "fierce examination of contemporary passing and the price so many pay for a new identity." Within a month of publication it was reported that HBO had acquired the rights for "low seven-figures" to develop a limited series with Bennett as executive producer.

Bibliography

References

Living people
21st-century African-American women writers
21st-century African-American writers
21st-century American essayists
21st-century American novelists
21st-century American women writers
African-American novelists
American women essayists
American women novelists
Novelists from California
People from Oceanside, California
Place of birth missing (living people)
Stanford University alumni
University of Michigan alumni
Year of birth missing (living people)